Alisary is a tiny settlement in Highland, Scotland.

Populated places in Lochaber